Landkreuzer is the German word for landship and may refer to:

 Landkreuzer P. 1000 Ratte, a proposed German tank in World War II
 Landkreuzer P. 1500 Monster, a proposed German self-propelled gun in World War II